Aiello is a surname of Italian origin.

Aiello or Ajello may also refer to:


Places of Italy

Municipalities (comuni)
Aiello Calabro, in the Province of Cosenza 
Aiello del Friuli, in the Province of Udine 
Aiello del Sabato, in the Province of Avellino
Serra d'Aiello, a town and comune in the province of Cosenza

Civil parishes (frazioni)
Aiello, in the municipality of Baronissi (SA)
Aiello, in the municipality of Castel San Giorgio (SA) 
Aiello, in the municipality of Crognaleto (TE)

Other uses 
 Aiello (singer)
 Mr. Aiello, a 1998 Canadian drama film directed by Paul Tana

See also
 Aielli, in the Province of L'Aquila in the Abruzzo region of Italy